McGalliard is a surname. Notable people with the surname include:

Dan McGalliard (1940–2021), American inventor
Harris McGalliard (1906–1978), American baseball player

See also
McGalliard Falls, waterfall in North Carolina, United States